Witryłów  (Vitryliv) is a village in the administrative district of Gmina Dydnia, within Brzozów County, Subcarpathian Voivodeship, in south-eastern Poland.

References

Villages in Brzozów County